Passionei is an Italian surname. Notable people with the surname include:

Domenico Silvio Passionei (1682–1761), Italian Roman Catholic cardinal 
Marco Passionei (1560–1625), Italian Roman Catholic priest

See also
Charles Félix Jean-Baptiste Camerata-Passionei di Mazzoleni

Italian-language surnames